Mohamed Ben Ammar ( is a Tunisian football player, currently playing for Stade Africain Menzel Bourguiba.

Career statistics

Club

Notes

References

External links
 

Living people
Tunisian footballers
Association football forwards
Tunisian Ligue Professionnelle 1 players
Stade Tunisien players
AS Marsa players
CS Hammam-Lif players
Stade Africain Menzel Bourguiba players
Year of birth missing (living people)